Jason Fox (born 31 August 1976), often referred to by his nickname 'Foxy', is a television presenter, adventurer and a former UK Special Forces soldier and Royal Marine Commando. He is best known as the longest serving directing staff on the popular Channel 4 television series SAS: Who Dares Wins, and the presenter of the investigative documentary series Meet the Drug Lords: Inside the Real Narcos.

Career

Military service 
Fox joined the Royal Marines Commandos in 1992 at the age of 16. In 2001, he joined the Special Boat Service and reached the rank of Sergeant. After 20 years of military service, Fox was medically discharged on 5 April 2012 having been diagnosed with Post Traumatic Stress Disorder (PTSD).

Television 
Fox is one of the original presenters and directing staff on SAS: Who Dares Wins, a reality television programme where contestants experience a gruelling training course loosely based on a condensed version of the special forces selection process. Fox stars alongside former special forces soldiers Ant Middleton, Matthew ‘Ollie’ Ollerton, Mark ‘Billy’ Billingham, and Jay Morton.  The programme first broadcast in 2015 is produced by Channel 4, and aired its fifth season in February 2020. In 2019, the first season of Celebrity SAS: Who Dares Wins aired which also stars Fox.

In 2018, Fox presented a three-part docuseries, Meet the Drug Lords: Inside the real Narcos. The series positioned Fox in his first investigative journalism role, spending time within drug cartels in Mexico, Colombia and Peru, meeting and talking to people living and working in those communities. Fox's interviews in the series included Popeye (Jhon Jairo Velásquez) – known as one of Pablo Escobars’ hitmen in Colombia.

In 2019, Fox presented the documentary The Final Mission: Foxy's War which saw him return to Afghanistan where he had served in the military.

Publications and other media 
In 2017, Fox co-authored the book SAS: Who Dares Wins: Leadership Secrets from the Special Forces, with his fellow TV presenters and Special Forces soldiers Anthony Middleton, Matthew "Ollie" Ollerton and Colin Maclachlan. The book triggered an  investigation by the British Ministry of Defence for alleged admissions of war crimes by the authors.

Fox released his own first book, Battle Scars in 2019 which explores his struggle with mental health after being medically discharged from his military career in 2012 having been diagnosed with PTSD.  Battle Scars became a Sunday Times best-seller.

His second book Life Under Fire: How to Build Inner Strength and Thrive Under Pressure was released October 15, 2020.

Fox became the host of the podcast Jason Fox Wild Tales in 2018, in conjunction with the Book of Man, with whom he is a regular columnist. In each episode, Fox interviews people who have experienced a variety of adventures in their life, touching on their background, and the mental and physical challenges they have faced.

Other 
Since leaving the military, Fox has had several public appearances talking about mental health, and is involved in supporting several charities. Fox is a co-founder of Rock to Recovery with fellow ex royal marine Jamie Sanderson. The pair set it up to assist returning servicemen, veterans and their families.

Outside of his military career, some of Fox's bigger adventures include rowing across the Atlantic Ocean from Lagos, Portugal to Macuro, Venezuela in 2016 with four of his friends including Oliver Bailey. Known as Team Essence, their expedition took the crew 50 days over 3,308 nautical miles, and landed them a record for becoming the first team to row unsupported, crossing the Atlantic Ocean from east to west - from mainland Europe to South America, non-stop from mainland to mainland. Across the journey, Team Essence also raised money for the NSPCC.

In April 2018, a team of ten adventurers, including Fox, embarked on an expedition to the North Pole.  They made this journey in aid of the charity Borne to raise awareness of premature birth, and also raised £750,000 for new research into its prevention.

In 2019, Fox alongside Sean Johnson kayaked the length of the Yukon river over 1,980 miles in Alaska. The adventure started with a 49-mile hike from Skagway to Lake Bennet, where the kayak journey stretched from Lake Bennett to the Bering Sea, across 48 days. The expedition was unsupported, with Johnson and Fox raising awareness and funds for Royal Navy and Royal Marines Charity.

Fox, with his co-star of SAS: Who Dares Wins, Ollie Ollerton, co-founded a corporate team building, training and events company. In 2019, Fox and Ollerton went on to launch the fitness and wellbeing app Battle Ready 360 – which focuses on personalised plans for individuals looking to balance mind, body and nutrition.

Fox is also an ambassador of Veterans 4 Wildlife, which campaigns against wildlife crime.

References

External links 
 
 

Living people
1976 births
English television presenters
Special Boat Service personnel
21st-century Royal Marines personnel
Military personnel from Plymouth, Devon